Hudson River Bridge may refer to:

 125th Street Hudson River bridge, a never-built bridge from Manhattan at 125th Street to New Jersey that was proposed in 1954
 Bear Mountain Bridge, built by the Bear Mountain Hudson River Bridge Company
 George Washington Bridge (opened 1931), informally known as the Hudson River Bridge during its construction
 Hudson River Bridge (1866-1901), a railroad bridge connecting Albany and Rensselaer, New York, replaced by the Livingston Avenue Bridge

See also
 List of crossings of the Hudson River